Coedffranc North is an electoral ward of Neath Port Talbot county borough, Wales.  is a part of the Coedffranc community and falls within the parliamentary constituency of Aberavon.

Coedffranc North is bounded by the wards of Dyffryn to the northeast; Coedffranc Central and Coedffranc West to the south; and Llansamlet of Swansea to the west.  The ward consists of a built up residential strip of north Skewen and the neighbourhood of Lon-Las to the south and rural farmland and woodland to the north on the slopes of Mynydd Drummau.

In the 2017 local council elections, the results were:

In the 2012 local council elections, the electorate turnout was 39.64%.  The results were:

References

Electoral wards of Neath Port Talbot